Groundwork or ground work may refer to:

Literature
 Groundwork of the Metaphysic of Morals or simply Groundwork, a 1785 philosophical treatise by Immanuel Kant
 Groundwork, a 1997 novel by Robert Anthony Welch
 Groundwork, a 1983 biography of Charles Hamilton Houston by Genna Rae McNeil
 Ground Work: Before the War, a 1984 book of poetry by Robert Duncan
 Ground Work: Selected Poems and Essays, 1970-79, a 1990 book by Paul Auster
 Groundwork: Autobiographical Writings, 1979–2012, a 2020 book by Paul Auster
 Ground Works: Avante-Garde for Thee, a 2003 book edited by Christian Bök

Music
 Groundwork, a 2010 mixtape by Yung Berg
 GroundWork Records, a record label co-founded by Jennifer Korbee
 GroundWorks, a South African hip-hop group featuring Snazz D

Organizations
 Groundwork UK, an environmental organisation working as a federation of trusts
 The Groundwork, an American technology firm
 Groundwork Collaborative, an American nonprofit organization

Other
Groundworker, a person who prepares land for building construction
Ground fighting or ground work, hand-to-hand combat that takes place on the ground
Ground work or ground training, a stage of horse training

See also
 Earthworks (disambiguation)